The PEN/Phyllis Naylor Working Writer Fellowship is awarded by the PEN America (formerly PEN American Center) annually to a writer of children's or young-adult fiction of high literary caliber "at a crucial moment in his or her career to complete a book-length work-in-progress." The author receives $5,000 and was made possible by PEN member Phyllis Reynolds Naylor, the Newbery Medal winner of such books as Sang Spell and Shiloh.

The author must be nominated by an editor or a fellow writer and must have published "at least two novels for children or young adults which have been warmly received by literary critics, but have not generated sufficient income to support the author."

The award is one of many PEN awards sponsored by International PEN affiliates in over 145 PEN centers around the world. The PEN America awards have been characterized as being among the "major" American literary prizes.

Award winners

References

External links
PEN America
PEN/Phyllis Naylor Working Writer Fellowship

PEN America awards
Awards established in 2001
2001 establishments in the United States
Literary awards honoring unpublished books or writers
American children's literary awards